Gandzakar is a village in the Ijevan Municipality of the Tavush Province of Armenia, located to the immediate south of the town of Ijevan.

Toponymy 
The village was known as Aghdan until 1978.

Administration 
The current mayor of Gandzakar is Shahen Shahinyan. The Deputy Mayor is Zarmayil Mardanyan. The village administration actively works with Peace Corps volunteers.

References

External links 

Populated places in Tavush Province